Maia Ciobanu (born 5 May 1952) is a Romanian composer and music educator. She is also the author of books, studies and papers on music.

Early years
Maia Ciobanu was born in Bucharest and studied at the Conservatory Ciprian Porumbescu. She studied composition with Dan Constantinescu and Myriam Marbe and piano with Aurora Ienei, and also studied with Ştefan Niculescu, Mircea Chiriac, Liviu Comes and Aurel Stroe. In 1980 she visited at the Darmstadt summer courses, and studied composition with Brian Ferneyhough, Gérard Grisey, Wolfgang Rihm, Hans Peter Haller, Włodzimierz Kotoński and Tristan Murail. In 1995, she studied at the Swedish Academy of Music in Gothenburg.

Career
Since 1992 Ciobanu has been musical director of the Group for Alternative Contemporary Music. In 1993 she became a professor at the Bucharest Theatre and Film School, and has taught courses on contemporary Romanian music at music academies in Gothenburg (1995) and Cologne (1996), at the Pedagogical College of Rorschach (1997) and the University of St. Gallen in Switzerland (2000).

Ciobanu won Honorable Mention at the "International Composition Contest – Mannheim GEDOK" in Germany (1981), the Romanian Academy "George Enescu Prize" (1998), the Romanian Composers' Association Prize (1999, 2022) and "The Order for Cultural Achievements" medal (2004).

Ciobanu was president of the Romanian Section of the International Society for Contemporary Music between 2002 and 2003, and is the founder and editor of the English-language journal Contemporary Music – Romana Newsletter of the section. Ciobanu is also active in publishing and produces music programs for Romanian radio. She is a member of the Romanian Composers Union, the International League of Women Composers, the International Computer Music Association and the Société des auteurs, compositeurs et éditeurs de musique .

Selected works

Sonata for clarinet, piano and percussion, 1974
Pămîntul trebuie să Trăiască for orchestra, 1975
Since Suonare for piano, 1976
Întilnire cu o altă melody for percussion and tape, 1978
Prelude for clarinet, guitar and trombone, 1980
Concerto for violin and orchestra, 1980
Trei Sculpturi for string quartet, 1981
Toamna, Madrigal for mixed choir to words by Ioan Nicolae Stănescu, 1981
Portret, Madrigal for mixed choir to words by Emil Botta, 1982
Pădurencele for nai, 1982
Decor I for clarinet and piano, 1983
Decembrie în Ardel for mixed choir, organ and drums on verses by Petru *Anghel, 1983
Dorul – Dor, Madrigal for mixed choir to words by Lucian Blaga, 1984
Decor II for flute and piano, 1984
Fîntîna I for organ and percussion, 1985
Fîntîna II for cello and organ, 1986
Urare de Belşug for female choir, 1986
De Dor for women's choir, 1986
Sorcova Peste de Vara for female choir, 1986
Povestea Vorbii, Chortryptichon for mixed choir to poems by Anton Pann, 1987
Decor III for clarinet, piano and synthesizer, 1988
Symphony No. 1 – Jurnal '88, 1988
3 Ostinato I for percussion and tape, 1989
Doina, Doinna, Cintec dulce, 1989
Concerto for piano and tape, 1990
Incidental music for Merlin of Tancred Dorst for electronic music, 1991
Veni-va! for tape, 1992
Fîntîna III for piano, synthesizer and percussion, 1992
Valsul Pelicanului for choir, flute, 2 pianos and percussion on verses by Robert Desnos, 1992
Comentarii for clarinet, piano, synthesizer and percussion, 1993
Radical political change , ballet, 1993
Eu, Nu, Ballet, 1994
Ostinato II for trombone, clarinet, piano and percussion, 1995
STII Episodul tu în care ... for flute, violin, viola and accordion, 1997
Invizabila Struna for violin, 1998
Concerto for percussion and tape, 1998
Jurnal'99 for tape, 1999
Autoportret for violin, cello and piano, 2000
Tacere cu Variaţiuni for clarinet, trombone, violin, cello, piano and percussion, 2000
Decor V for 2 flutes and nai, 2000
Decor IV for clarinet and viola (2003)
 for tape, 2003
Medium I for tape, 2003
Pădurencele for chorus to words by Emil Botta, 2003
 for piano, actors and tape, 2004
Concerto for clarinet and string orchestra, 2004
Muzica Alternative I, II, III and electronic media, piano and dancers, 2005
Symphony No. 2, 2006
 for ensemble, 2006
Climate for tape, 2006
NR.273,16: Intersecţii (Crossroads) for saxophone, viola and live electronics (2007)

Discography

Ciobanu's recorded work includes:

The Earth Must Live
Ostinato II 
Da Suonare 
The Invisible String
Concerto
Journal '99
It Shall Come!
Symphony i Journal '88, Three Sculptures for String Quartet, Journal '99 for violin and tape

References

1952 births
20th-century classical composers
Romanian classical composers
Romanian music educators
Women classical composers
Living people
Politicians from Bucharest
21st-century classical composers
Enescu Prize winners
20th-century women composers
21st-century women composers